Momentum Pictures is an independent film distributor and a subsidiary of Entertainment One, itself part of Hasbro. Prior to 2013, it was a brand of Canadian distributor Alliance Films used for its releases in the United Kingdom, and was one of the leading independent distributors in the UK and Ireland. Following eOne's purchase of the company, Alliance and its divisions were folded under the eOne brand. The Momentum brand was revived in 2015 as part of a venture with Orion Pictures to jointly acquire films for distribution in North America and international markets.

The studio has also released several family films, such as Hoodwinked!, The Adventures of Rocky and Bullwinkle (co-distributed with United International Pictures as part of a two-year agreement), Arthur and the Invisibles and Igor, as well as the home video rights for popular TV series Creature Comforts.

Theatrical releases
Pre-2015 release dates are United Kingdom only.

2023
 Palm Trees and Power Lines (3 March)
 Swallowed (14 February)

2022
 Soft & Quiet (4 November)
 To Leslie (7 October)
 Neon Lights (12 July)
 Dashcam (3 June)
 All My Puny Sorrows (3 May)

2021
 Witch Hunt (1 October)
 Port Authority (28 May)

2020
 Black Bear (4 December)
 The Devil Has a Name (16 October)
 The 2nd (1 September)
 Stage Mother (21 August)
 Escape from Pretoria (6 March)
 Disturbing the Peace (17 January)

2019
 Dude Perfect: Trickshots (17 December)
 The Death & Life of John F. Donovan (13 December)
 A Million Little Pieces (6 December)
 Farming (25 October)
 Bloodline (20 September)
 Haunt (13 September)
 Nekrotronic (9 August)
 Finding Steve McQueen (15 March)
 Among the Shadows (5 March)

2018
 Asher (7 December)
 I Think We're Alone Now (14 September)
 Boarding School (31 August)
 211 (8 June)
 The Last Witness (29 May)
 Steven Tyler: Out on a Limb (15 May)
 Beast of Burden (23 February)
 Half Magic (23 February)
 Looking Glass (16 February)
 The Clapper (26 January)
 Mom and Dad (19 January)
 Stratton (5 January)

2017
 The Girl Who Invented Kissing (12 December)
 Jungle (20 October)
 6 Below: Miracle on the Mountain (13 October)
 Goon: Last of the Enforcers (1 September)
 Fun Mom Dinner (4 August)
 The Gracefield Incident (21 July)
 Manhattan Undying (6 June)
 The Shadow Effect (2 May)
 Voice from the Stone (28 April)
 Johnny Frank Garrett's Last Word (14 March)
 Brimstone (10 March)
 Devil in the Dark (7 March)
 The Institute (3 March)
 In Dubious Battle (17 February)
 Blowtorch (7 February)
 Wheeler (3 February)
 Bad Kids of Crestview Academy (13 January)
 The Bronx Bull (6 January)
 Zombie Massacre 2: Reich of the Dead (3 January)

2016
 Abattoir (9 December)
 Oddball (6 December)
 Run the Tide (2 December)
 Pocket Listing (1 December)
 My Dead Boyfriend (3 November)
 The Possession Experiment (27 October)
 Jack Goes Home (14 October)
 The Late Bloomer (7 October)
 Milton's Secret (30 September)
 Ithaca (9 September)
 The Perfect Weapon (9 September)
 Rampage: President Down (6 September)
 Quitters (22 July)
 Outlaws and Angels (15 July)
 Septembers of Shiraz (24 June)
 Andron (3 June)
 Hard Sell (20 May)
 The Asian Connection (13 May)
 Bling (6 May)
 The Offering (6 May)
 The Program (18 March)
 Ava's Possessions (4 March)
 Forsaken (19 February)
 All Roads Lead to Rome (5 February)
 Intruders (15 January)
 The Benefactor (15 January)
 Diablo (8 January)
 Indigenous (5 January)

2015 (relaunch)
 Imba Means Sing (4 December)
 The Wannabe (4 December)
 Lost in the Sun (5 November)
 Yakuza Apocalypse (9 October)
 The Night Crew (10 August)
 Elephant Song (13 July)
 Wild Horses (5 June)

2013
 Snitch (21 June)
 Populaire (31 May)
 21 & Over (3 May)
 The Lords of Salem (19 April)
 Dark Skies (3 April)
 In the House (29 March)
 Welcome to the Punch (15 March)
 Robot & Frank (8 March)
 The Bay (1 March)
 Safe Haven (1 March)
 Antiviral (1 February)
 Movie 43 (25 January)
 V/H/S (18 January)
 Quartet (1 January)

2012
 Dead Europe (14 December)
 Seven Psychopaths (5 December)
 Gambit (21 November)
 We Are the Night (15 October)
 Hit & Run (12 October)
 Sinister (5 October)
 The Babymakers (28 September)
 House at the End of the Street (21 September)
 Hope Springs (14 September)
 Anton Corbijn: Inside Out (14 September)
 Lawless (7 September)
 Tim and Eric's Billion Dollar Movie (24 August)
 The Players (6 July)
 Red Lights (15 June)
 Red Tails (6 June)
 The Raid: Redemption (18 May)
 Café de Flore (11 May)
 The Rise and Fall of a White Collar Hooligan (7 May)
 Safe (4 May)
 The Divide (20 April)
 Headhunters (6 April)
 Act of Valor (23 March)
 The Woman in Black (10 February)
 Haywire (18 January)
 Shame (13 January)

2011
 Justice (18 November)
 Trollhunter (9 September)
 Weekender (2 September)
 Hobo with a Shotgun (15 July)
 Red Hill (13 May)
 Insidious (29 April)
 Limitless (23 March)
 Chalet Girl (16 March)
 The Fighter (2 February)
 The Mechanic (28 January)
 Season of the Witch (7 January)
 The King's Speech (7 January)

2010
 Catfish (17 December)
 The Girl Who Kicked the Hornets' Nest (26 November)
 Skyline (12 November)
 Another Year (5 November)
 Frozen (24 September)
 The Horde (17 September)
 Tamara Drewe (10 September)
 The Girl Who Played with Fire (27 August)
 Goemon (23 July)
 The Rebound (23 July)
 Brooklyn's Finest (11 June)
 Dear John (14 April)
 The Spy Next Door (19 March)
 The Girl with the Dragon Tattoo (12 March)
 The Crazies (26 February)
 Youth in Revolt (5 February)
 44 Inch Chest (15 January)

2009
 Law Abiding Citizen (27 November)
 Glorious 39 (20 November)
 The Men Who Stare at Goats (6 November)
 White Lightnin' (25 September)
 The September Issue (11 September)
 Dorian Gray (9 September)
 Mesrine: Public Enemy #1 (28 August)
 A Perfect Getaway (14 August)
 Mesrine: Killer Instinct (7 August)
 Last Chance Harvey (5 June)
 Outlander (24 April)
 Lesbian Vampire Killers (20 March)
 The Young Victoria (6 March)
 Milk (23 January)
 The Crew (12 January)
 Defiance (9 January)

2008
 The Baader Meinhof Complex (14 November)
 Igor (17 October)
 The Fall (3 October)
 Fly Me to the Moon (3 October)
 The Foot Fist Way (26 September)
 The Wave (19 September)
 Disaster Movie (5 September)
 The Mist (4 July)
 Teeth (20 June)
 Superhero Movie (6 June)
 Automaton Transfusion (19 May)
 Caramel (16 May)
 Vexille (9 May)
 Happy-Go-Lucky (18 April)
 The Banquet (11 April)
 Never Back Down (4 April)
 Love in the Time of Cholera (21 March)
 The Accidental Husband (29 February)
 Penelope (1 February)
 The Good Night (18 January)
 P.S. I Love You (4 January)

2007
 Chromophobia (14 December)
 Planet Terror (9 November)
 The Last Legion (19 October)
 Control (5 October)
 Scorpion (24 September)
 Bratz (17 August)
 The Hoax (3 August)
 Shut Up and Sing (29 June)
 The Painted Veil (27 April)
 The Pleasure Drivers (16 April)
 The Messengers (6 April)
 Amazing Grace (23 March)
 Hannibal Rising (9 February)
 Arthur and the Invisibles (2 February)
 Bobby (26 January)
 Miss Potter (5 January)

2006
 Heartstopper (18 December)
 Joy Division (17 November)
 The Last Kiss (20 October)
 Hoodwinked! (29 September)
 Snow Cake (8 September)
 Wilderness (11 August)
 Atomised (14 July)
 2001 Maniacs (26 June)
 Things to Do Before You're 30 (2 June)
 Waiting... (19 May)
 The Other Half (15 May)
 Prime (12 May)
 Metal: A Headbanger's Journey (28 April)
 The Dark (7 April)
 The Big White (24 March)
 Tsotsi (17 March)
 The Weather Man (3 March)
 Just Friends (6 January)

2005
 Where the Truth Lies (2 December)
 Broken Flowers (21 October)
 Lord of War (14 October)
 Born to Fight (2 September)
 The United States of Leland (1 July)
 Inside Deep Throat (10 June)
 Seed of Chucky (13 May)
 Downfall (1 April)
 Mickybo and Me (25 March)
 Casshern (25 February)
 The Door in the Floor (11 February)
 Racing Stripes (4 February)
 Vera Drake (7 January)

2004
 My House in Umbria (26 November)
 Inside I'm Dancing (15 October)
 Wicker Park (10 September)
 Stage Beauty (3 September)
 Nathalie... (16 July)
 The Company (7 May)
 Eternal Sunshine of the Spotless Mind (30 April)
 Wondrous Oblivion (23 April)
 One Last Chance (12 March)
 People I Know (13 February)
 Game Over: Kasparov and the Machine (23 January)
 Lost in Translation (9 January)

2003
 Out of Time (26 December)
 Together with You (12 December)
 American Cousins (28 November)
 The Mother (14 November)
 Raising Victor Vargas (19 September)
 Confidence (22 August)
 Standing in the Shadows of Motown (25 July)
 Dark Blue (4 July)
 Dirty Deeds (6 June)
 The Actors (16 May)
 I Capture the Castle (9 May)
 Equilibrium (14 March)
 The Magdalene Sisters (21 February)
 Bollywood/Hollywood (14 February)
 The Kid Stays in the Picture (7 February)

2002
 Bowling for Columbine (15 November)
 My Little Eye (4 October)
 Van Wilder (27 September)
 Scratch (30 August)
 Hijack Stories (19 July)
 Novocaine (5 July)
 No Man's Land (17 May)
 Slackers (10 May)
 Crossroads (29 March)
 The Son's Room (15 February)
 Just Visiting (8 February)
 Made (25 January)

2001
 Formula 51 (7 December)
 Me Without You (23 November)
 Down from the Mountain (26 October)
 Amélie (5 October)
 The Center of the World (21 September)
 Shiner (14 September)
 Get Over It (8 June)
 You Can Count on Me (23 March)
 The Adventures of Rocky and Bullwinkle (9 February)
 Requiem for a Dream (19 January)

2000
 Cecil B. Demented (8 December)
 The Way of the Gun (17 November)
 O Brother, Where Art Thou? (15 September)

Awards
In February 2011, Momentum Pictures won eight BAFTA awards, more than any other UK distributor. Seven awards went to The King's Speech, including Best Film and Best Actor. The Girl With the Dragon Tattoo'' won Best Film Not in the English Language.

References

External links 
 

Entertainment One
Film distributors of the United Kingdom
Film distributors of Canada
Film distributors of the United States
Film production companies of the United Kingdom
Film production companies of Canada
Film production companies of the United States
Entertainment companies established in 1996
Companies disestablished in 2013
Entertainment companies established in 2015